Black Lake, connected to nearby Lake Tilden, is a 233 acre natural freshwater lake on the west side of Orlando, Florida, in Orange County, Florida. This lake, with some swampy shores, meets Black Lake on its northwest side. To the south side of the lake is Florida State Road 429, a toll highway. Residential housing developments are on the southwest and north sides of the lake. The entire lake is surrounded by private property, so there is no public access to this lake.

References

Lakes of Orange County, Florida